CANS may refer to:

Childhood acute neuropsychiatric symptoms
Complaints of the arm, neck, and shoulder

See also
 Cans (disambiguation)
 CAN (disambiguation)